Homecoming is a live album by jazz pianist Bill Evans with Marc Johnson and Joe LaBarbera recorded at Southeastern Louisiana University in 1979 but not released until 1999 on the Milestone label.

Reception
The Allmusic review by Rick Anderson awarded the album 4 stars and states "This disc is a valuable historical document, but it's also a genuine pleasure to listen to". The All About Jazz review by Douglas Payne stated "Homecoming is a rich, instructive insight into the genius of this already over-recorded piano wonder — for hardcore devotees and the mildly interested alike... Homecoming is worth coming home to".

Track listing
All compositions by Bill Evans except as indicated
 "Re: Person I Knew" - 4:03
 "Midnight Mood" (Ben Raleigh, Joe Zawinul) - 6:22
 "Laurie" - 7:46
 "Theme from M*A*S*H (Suicide Is Painless)" (Mike Altman, Johnny Mandel) - 4:11
 "Turn Out the Stars" - 4:52
 "Very Early" - 5:11
 "But Beautiful" (Johnny Burke, Jimmy Van Heusen) - 4:12
 "I Loves You, Porgy" (George Gershwin, Ira Gershwin, DuBose Heyward) - 5:40
 "Up with the Lark" (Jerome Kern, Leo Robin) - 5:38
 "Minha (All Mine)" (Francis Hime) - 3:41
 "I Do It for Your Love" (Paul Simon) - 5:52
 "Some Day My Prince Will Come" (Frank Churchill, Larry Morey) - 6:25
 Interview with Bill Evans by Rod Starns - 6:00
Recorded at the Southeastern Louisiana University in Hammond, Louisiana on November 6, 1979.

Personnel
Bill Evans - piano
Marc Johnson - bass
Joe LaBarbera - drums

References

Bill Evans live albums
1999 live albums
Milestone Records live albums